Houlden is a surname. Notable people with the surname include:

 Jordan Houlden (born 1998), British diver
 Leslie Houlden (1929–2022), British Anglican priest and academic

See also
 Holden (surname)
 Moulden